In Memory of Quorthon is a box set of three audio CDs and one DVD with remastered material from Bathory, Quorthon's solo efforts, and the Jennie Tebler project.

The track list was selected by "Boss" Forsberg. The album cover was drawn by Kristian Wåhlin and was meant to be the artwork for Bathory's last album which was never released. All songs were remastered. A poster of Quorthon breathing fire taken from the 1987 session in London's Railway Bridge of London was included. Text written by Quorthon personally appears in italics. Besides lyrics, the book features Bathory's history, discography, background on the first recordings – with titles, years, studios, covers – and even a couple of photographs. Nearly all of this is from Quorthon's and Boss's own private archives.

The fourth disc is a DVD containing the 11-minute video for "One Rode to Asa Bay", as well as the MTV interview Quorthon did in London for the release of Hammerheart.

Track listing
All tracks are performed by Bathory, except where noted.

Disc 1
 "Song to Hall Up High" (from Hammerheart)
 "Oden's Ride Over Nordland" (from Blood Fire Death)
 "Twilight of the Gods" (from Twilight of the Gods)
 "Foreverdark Woods" (from Nordland I)
 "A Fine Day to Die" (from Blood Fire Death)
 "The Woodwoman" (from Blood on Ice)
 Quorthon – "I've Had It Coming My Way" (from Purity of Essence)
 "Armageddon" (from Bathory)
 "Born to Die" (from Octagon)
 Quorthon – "God Save the Queen"  (Sex Pistols cover, previously released on the Black Mark Tribute vol. 1 compilation)
 "The Sword" (from Blood on Ice)
 "For All Those Who Died" (from Blood Fire Death)
 "Call from the Grave" (from Under the Sign of the Black Mark)
 "Born for Burning" (from The Return……)
 Quorthon – "Boy" (from Album)

Disc 2
 "One Rode to Asa Bay" (from Hammerheart)
 "The Lake" (from Blood on Ice)
 "The Land" (from Nordland II)
 "Raise the Dead" (from Bathory)
 "War Pigs" (Black Sabbath cover, previously released on the Black Mark Tribute vol. 2 compilation)
 "Enter the Eternal Fire" (from Under the Sign of the Black Mark)
 "Blood Fire Death" (from Blood Fire Death)
 "Ring of Gold" (from Nordland I)
 "War Machine" (from Requiem)
 "War" (from Bathory)
 "Ace of Spades" (Motörhead cover, previously released on the Black Mark Tribute vol. 1 compilation)
 "Death and Resurrection of a Northern Son" (from Nordland II)
 "The Ravens" (from Blood on Ice)

Disc 3
 "The Wheel of Sun" (from Nordland II)
 "Apocalypse" (from Requiem)
 "Black Diamond" (Kiss cover, previously released on the A Tribute to the Creatures of the Night compilation)
 "Woman of Dark Desires" (from Under the Sign of the Black Mark)
 "Destroyer of Worlds" (from Destroyer of Worlds)
 "Sea Wolf" (from Nordland II)
 "Deuce" (Kiss cover, from Octagon)
 "The Return of Darkness and Evil" (from The Return……)
 "Day of Wrath" (from Destroyer of Worlds)
 Quorthon – "I'm Only Sleeping" (The Beatles cover, previously released on the Black Mark Tribute vol. 2 compilation)
 "Ode" (from Destroyer of Worlds)
 "Hammerheart" (from Twilight of the Gods)
 "Heimfard" (from Nordland I)
 "Outro"
 Quorthon – "You Just Got to Live" (from Purity of Essence)
 Jennie Tebler – "Silverwing" (music and all instruments by Quorthon, previously released on Jennie Tebler's Silverwing single)
 Jennie Tebler – "Song to Hall Up High" (instrumental tracks by Bathory with new vocals by Jennie Tebler, previously released on Jennie Tebler's Silverwing single)

Bathory (band) compilation albums
Albums with cover art by Kristian Wåhlin
2006 compilation albums
2006 video albums
Compilation albums published posthumously